Shamrocks GAA is a Gaelic Athletic Association club located in Mucklagh, County Offaly, Ireland. The club fields teams in both hurling and Gaelic football.

History

Located in the village of Mucklagh, on the Tullamore-Birr road, Shamrocks GAA Club was founded on 24 March 1992 following an amalgamation of the St. Carthage's and Mucklagh clubs. It followed on from the formation of a Shamrocks underage club in 1992.

Shamrocks enjoyed a successful season in 2000, winning the Offaly U21AFC title as well as the first of three Offaly IHC titles. Further successes were achieved in 2014 and 2022. Shamrocks have also appeared in three Offaly SFC finals in 2000, 2005 and 2007, but have failed to secure the title. The club won the Offaly SBFC title in 2018.

Honours

Offaly Senior B Football Championship (1): 2018
Offaly Intermediate Hurling Championship (3): 2000, 2014, 2022
Offaly Junior B Football Championship (1): 2007
Offaly Under 21A Football Championship (1): 2000

Notable players

 Neville Coughlan: Offaly senior footballer
 Derek Molloy: Offaly senior hurler

References

Gaelic games clubs in County Offaly
Hurling clubs in County Offaly
Gaelic football clubs in County Offaly